The Embassy of  the Republic of Yemen in London is the diplomatic mission of Yemen in the United Kingdom. The embassy occupies a five-storey nineteenth-century house opposite the Natural History Museum.

Gallery

References

Yemen
United Kingdom–Yemen relations
London
Buildings and structures in the Royal Borough of Kensington and Chelsea
South Kensington